PBCC may refer to:

 Plymouth Brethren Christian Church
 Palm Beach Community College
 Pakistan Blind Cricket Council
 PowerBASIC Console Compiler
 Punjab Boards Committee of Chairmen, see Board of Intermediate and Secondary Education, Rawalpindi
 Parkersburg Correctional Center, see West Virginia Division of Corrections
 Putney Bridge Canoe Club